Dhori Mata Tirthalaya , also known as the Shrine of Miraculous Mother of the Coal Mines is a Roman Catholic Church dedicated to the Virgin Mary. It is located in Bokaro, 2.2 km north-west of Jarangdih, in the Indian state of Jharkhand.

Overview
It has a statue of Mother Mary and baby Jesus. The statue was named Dhori Mata, after the place in which it was found. A large number of people attend the 9-day festival every year that concludes with the Missa Puja on the last Sunday of October. Dhori Mata is considered to be the patroness of the coal miners.

History
The statue of Dhori Mata was accidentally found on 12 June 1956 by a coal field worker name Rupa Satnami from Bilaspur, Chhattisgarh working in the mines of Jarangdih, Bokaro, Jharkhand. While excavating coal he heard a voice saying in Hindi “Strike gently, I am here.” Unfortunately, one of the arms of statue of Mother Mary had been broken off by the axe of Satnami.

In the month of October 1957, the statue of Dhori Mata was placed in the Saint Anthony Church in Jarangdih. The statue was brought out of the church and installed in the shrine in May 1964. The statue of Dhori Mata was specially blessed by Pope Paul VI during his pastoral visit to Mumbai in 1964. Later in 1967, the statue was sent to Belgium and was found to be made of jackfruit wood and dated to be approximately 400-500 years old. On 30th October, 1983 the Shrine was formally inaugurated. The shrine is decorated with lamps and is having may beautiful paintings of Jesus Christ.

The statue was stolen in January 2008 but recovered the next day.

See also
 Black Madonna

References

Roman Catholic churches in Jharkhand
Catholic pilgrimage sites
Shrines to the Virgin Mary
Roman Catholic shrines in India